The following are the national records in athletics in North Macedonia maintained by its national athletics federation: Athletic Federation of North Macedonia (AFNM).

Outdoor

Key to tables:

+ = en route to a longer distance

h = hand timing

# = not recognised by World Athletics

NWI = no wind information

Men

Women

Indoor

Men

Women

Notes

References
General
Macedonian Records 5 March 2022 updated
Specific

External links
AFM web site

North Macedonia
Records
Athletics